Korea University is a university-level miscellaneous school located in Kodaira, Tokyo. It was established by ethnic activist association and de facto North Korean embassy Chongryon on 10 April 1956. Korean is the medium of instruction. It operates seven four-year faculties: political economy (including courses in philosophy under its rubric), literature, history and geography, management, foreign languages, science (physics, mathematics, and biochemistry) and technology (mechanical engineering, electronic engineering, and metallurgy). The school also runs two and three-year normal school programmes, as well as a two-year post-graduate school.

The school has received funding directly from the government of North Korea every year since 1957; for example, in 2002, it received ¥132,420,000 in funding at the direction of Kim Jong-il.

This school offers a university level education, but based on the  Japanese School Education Law, it is not authorized a “university” and consequently is treated as a "miscellaneous school.”

Most students become teachers at Chongryon-affiliated schools after graduation. As of July 2001, the school's rector is Chang Byong Tae, a graduate of Kyoto University and a former researcher in solid-state chemistry with France's Centre national de la recherche scientifique.

See also
 Chōsen gakkō - North Korean primary and secondary schools in Japan

References

External links
  
  
 

Educational institutions established in 1956
Schools in Tokyo
Private schools in Japan
+
Japan–North Korea relations
Kodaira, Tokyo
1956 establishments in Japan